InnoSpark Inc (Kor. 이노스파크) is a mobile game development company founded in April 2012 by key members of the team who created the top-grossing game in Korea: Rule the Sky, published by JCE. The company’s debut game was Dragon Friends, originally serviced by NHN. From February 27, 2015, InnoSpark started directly servicing Dragon Friends in South Korea and 175 other countries. By now InnoSpark has also fully released and is servicing Hero Sky: Epic Guild Wars.

In June 2015 InnoSpark raised $6.5 million in a Series B funding round. The funding round was led by venture capital firm Keynote Ventures, SL Investment and Company K Partners.
InnoSpark is expected to use the funding to continue developing games and enter the Chinese market.

Games 
Dragon Friends: Green Witch (2013) is a social farming game centered on breeding and collecting different cute dragons. It is currently available on iOS, Android, Kindle, Windows and Facebook.

Hero Sky:Epic Guild Wars (2014) (kor. 히어로스카이 ) is a strategic game somewhat similar to Clash of Clans, but with an additional complex Hero System. It reached 3 000 000 downloads in 2015. It is available on iOS, Android, Windows and Facebook.

History

2015 
July 8 – Hero Sky: Epic Guild Wars re-opening service in Korea 
June - $6.5m in a Series B funding round 
March 19 – Hero Sky: Epic Guild Wars Global Launching in 154 countries 
February 27 – Starting Global Service of Dragon Friends

2014 
August 8 – Hero Sky (kor. 히어로스카이 ) launching in Korea (with Nexon)

2013 
December – Dragon Friends Awarded Best New Entry in Korean Apple Appstore 2013 
August 22 – Dragon Friends Launching (with NHN) 
March – ₩2 billion investment.

2012 
June – partnership with NHN 
April 19 – company foundation day.

References

Links 
 

Mobile game companies
Video game companies established in 2012
Companies based in Seoul
Video game companies of South Korea
South Korean brands